The fifth season of the American political drama television series The West Wing aired in the United States on NBC from September 24, 2003, to May 19, 2004, and consisted of 22 episodes. This was the first season with executive producer John Wells as showrunner after series creator Aaron Sorkin departed the series at the end of the previous season.

Cast 
The fifth season had star billing for nine major roles. All nine of these were filled by returning main cast members from the fourth season. The cast was credited in alphabetical order except for Martin Sheen, who was listed last. Stockard Channing is only credited for the episodes in which she appears.

Main cast 
 Stockard Channing as Abbey Bartlet
 Dulé Hill as Charlie Young
 Allison Janney as C. J. Cregg
 Joshua Malina as Will Bailey
 Janel Moloney as Donna Moss
 Richard Schiff as Toby Ziegler
 John Spencer as Leo McGarry
 Bradley Whitford as Josh Lyman
 Martin Sheen as Josiah Bartlet

Plot 
The fifth season opens with US forces rescuing Zoey Bartlet from her abductors. Bartlet takes the presidency back from acting president Walken, but is forced back into a level of powerlessness. He comes to terms with his actions that led to his daughter's kidnapping, a new Republican Speaker of the House (Walken has had to resign in order to assume the presidency) who forces Bartlet into several decisions he does not want to make, including the nomination of an unimpressive Democrat, "Bingo Bob" Russell, for vice president. The conflict with the new Speaker comes to a head in "Shutdown", when the Speaker tries to force Bartlet into cutting federal spending more than had been agreed to and Bartlet refuses to sign the budget, forcing the federal government into a shutdown. Bartlet regains some of his power, cutting a deal to get a liberal Chief Justice of the United States, and season five ends with a bombing in Gaza leading Bartlet to push for Israeli peace talks and Josh to be closer to Donna after she is critically wounded. The fifth season begins toward the end of Bartlet's first year of his second term (fifth year overall) in office. By the end of the season, over a year has elapsed.

Episodes

Reception

Critical response
On Rotten Tomatoes, the season has an approval rating of 62% with an average score of 7.8 out of 10 based on 13 reviews. The website's critical consensus reads, "Executive producer John Wells admirably attempts to maintain the spirit of Aaron Sorkin's vision after succeeding him, but The West Wings fifth season is a sloppy changing of the guard that bears the Bartlet administration's agenda but possesses not of its finesse or flair."

Accolades
The fifth season received 12 Emmy Award nominations for the 56th Primetime Emmy Awards, winning one award—Allison Janney for Outstanding Lead Actress in a Drama Series, her fourth win. It was nominated for Outstanding Drama Series, the first year the series did not win the award. Acting nominations included Martin Sheen for Outstanding Lead Actor in a Drama Series, John Spencer for Outstanding Supporting Actor in a Drama Series, Stockard Channing and Janel Moloney for Outstanding Supporting Actress in a Drama Series, and Matthew Perry for Outstanding Guest Actor in a Drama Series.

Thomas Del Ruth received two nominations from the American Society of Cinematographers for the episodes "7A WF 83429" and "Gaza".

References

General references

External links
 

 
2003 American television seasons
2004 American television seasons